The Honourable Griselda "Gizzi" Maxwell Erskine (born 20 August 1979) is an English cook and TV personality.

Early years

Erskine was born in Wandsworth, to photographer Iain Maxwell Erskine, 2nd Baron Erskine of Rerrick (1926-1995), and his second wife, model and actress Maria Josephine (daughter of Dr Josef Klupt, of Richmond, Surrey). She was the second of three daughters, all Wandsworth born.

Career
She trained at Leiths School of Food and Wine in London.

Erskine presented two seasons of Channel 4's cookery show Cook Yourself Thin and presented Channel 4's daytime programme Cookery School in 2011. She has also presented cookery features for ITV1's This Morning, contributed to Healthy Food Guide magazine and appeared on Sky1's Taste. She now co-presents channel 4's cookery programme Drop Down Menu with Matt Tebbutt. She has also appeared on other TV shows, including Cooks To Market and Iron Chef on Channel 4. As a food writer, her books include Kitchen Magic and Skinny Weeks and Weekend Feasts.

On 14 July 2013, she joined The Sunday Times as the Sunday Times Cook in the newspaper's weekly magazine.

Erskine is co-host of the podcast Sex, Lies and DM Slides, along with Sydney Lima. Each week celebrity guests such as Rose McGowan, Ruby Wax, Munroe Bergdorf and Jon Ronson are invited to open up their social media DM boxes.

Bibliography 
Cookbooks
 Gizzi's Kitchen Magic (2010)
 My Kitchen Table: 100 Foolproof Suppers (2012)
 Skinny Weeks and Weekend Feasts (2013)
 Gizzi's Healthy Appetite (2015)
 Gizzi's Season's Eatings (2016)
 Restore  (2020)

References

External links
 
 

Living people
1979 births
English writers
English journalists
English chefs
English television presenters
Daughters of barons
Gizzi
People from Wandsworth
Women chefs
English people of Scottish descent